Rikke Emma Niebuhr (born in Aarhus, Denmark) is a singer who rose to popularity as the winner of Idols Denmark 2, the Danish version of Pop Idol. Rikke won with 65% of the total vote against Louise Baltzer Jensen.

In late 2005, it was revealed that Rikke was not given the 500,000DK contract with BMG Denmark as promised with the Idols title, no official reason was ever given.

Idols Denmark 2 performances
Top 18: "There You'll Be" by Faith Hill
Top 8: "I Love You Baby"
Top 6: "Hit 'Em Up Style (Oops!)" by Blu Cantrell
Top 5: "Ain't It Funny" by Jennifer Lopez
Top 4: "Heaven" by Bryan Adams
Top 4: "What Becomes of the Broken Hearted?" by Jimmy Ruffin
Top 4: "Walking in Memphis" by Marc Cohn
Grand Final: "Get There"
Grand Final: "Holding Out for a Hero" by Bonnie Tyler
Grand Final: "There You'll Be" by Faith Hill

Discography
 "Get There" – #2 Denmark

References

Idols (TV series) winners
Danish women singers
Living people
English-language singers from Denmark
Year of birth missing (living people)